Lucius Domitius Ahenobarbus may refer to:

Lucius Domitius Ahenobarbus (consul 94 BC)
Lucius Domitius Ahenobarbus (consul 54 BC)
Lucius Domitius Ahenobarbus (consul 16 BC)
Lucius Domitius Ahenobarbus, better known as the Roman emperor Nero

See also
Ahenobarbus (disambiguation)